Frederick Wiley Stevens (August 28, 1861, Goshen, Indiana – May 22, 1932) was an American physicist, known for his research on gaseous explosive reactions. He was elected in 1931 a fellow of the American Physical Society.

Biography
Stevens graduated in 1886 with a bachelor's degree from the University of Michigan. In the year of his graduation, he married Mary Josephine Perrine.

From 1886 to 1888 Stevens did two years at post-graduate work at the University of Michigan. From 1888 to 1891 he was an instructor in physics at the University of Chicago. In 1891 he was appointed a professor of physics at Lake Forest College. In 1892 he studied at the University of Strasbourg (named Universität Straßburg at that time). On a two-year academic leave of absence he did research in physics at the University of Göttingen for academic year 1896–1897 and at the University of Leipzig for the academic year 1896-97.

In the 1920s and early 1930s he worked in Washington, D.C. for the National Bureau of Standards (now named the National Institute of Standards and Technology). He was a member of the Cosmos Club from 1925 until his death in 1932.

Selected publications
 
 
 
 
 
  (19 pages)

References

1861 births
1932 deaths
19th-century American physicists
20th-century American physicists
University of Michigan alumni
Lake Forest College faculty
National Institute of Standards and Technology people
Fellows of the American Physical Society
People from Goshen, Indiana